Great Braxted is a village between Great Totham and Tiptree in Essex, England. The population as of the 2011 census was 130. The local manor house is known as Braxted Park. The medieval All Saints' church is contained within its 2,000-acre estate.

The place-name 'Braxted' is first attested in the Domesday Book of 1086, where it appears as Brachesteda. The name comes from the Old English 'braec', meaning 'newly cultivated land'. Great Braxted is first attested (in Latin) as Magna Bracsted in 1206, whilst Little Braxted is first attested as Parva Bracstede in 1254.

References

External links

Villages in Essex
Maldon District